The women's épée was one of ten fencing events on the fencing at the 1996 Summer Olympics programme. It was the first appearance of the event. The competition was held on 21 July 1996. 48 fencers from 24 nations competed.

Draw

Finals

Section 1

Section 2

Section 3

Section 4

Results

References

Epee women
1996 in women's fencing
Fen